The governor of Chelyabinsk Oblast is the highest official of Chelyabinsk Oblast, a federal subject of Russia. The governor heads the executive branch in the region.

History of office 
In 1993 the first gubernatorial election was held in Chelyabinsk Oblast, after the Regional Council of People's Deputies passed a motion of no confidence against Head of Administration Vadim Solovyov. He immediately declared it illegal and refused to run. In June 1993 governor-elect Pyotr Sumin formed his own administration. It was recognized by most of the municipalities of Chelyabinsk Oblast, but not the federal government and president Boris Yeltsin, who reaffirmed Solovyov in office in October 1993.

In December 1996 Sumin won the election again, and was sworn in on 5 January 1997. In 2005 and 2010 governor was appointed by the Legislative Assembly from the candidates proposed by the President of Russia, as gubernatorial elections were abolished countrywide until 2012.

List of officeholders

References 

Politics of Chelyabinsk Oblast
 
Chelyabinsk